Jakup Krasniqi (born 1 January 1951) is a Kosovo-Albanian politician and former acting President of Kosovo. He is former Chairman of the Assembly of Kosovo. In November 2020 he was arrested for charges of crimes against humanity and war crime filed before the Kosovo Specialist Chambers.

Early life
Jakup Krasniqi was born near Glogovac, Kosovo to Albanian parents. He finished elementary school in his birthplace, Negroc, in 1965 while he finished high school in Prishtina in 1971. He attended the Faculty of Philology of the University of Prishtina and graduated in 1976.

Political career
During the Kosovo War, he was the spokesman for the Kosovo Liberation Army (UÇK).

As of 28 September 2010, Jakup Krasniqi served as the acting President of Kosovo, following the resignation of Fatmir Sejdiu following a constitutional crisis. As of 31 March 2011, Jakup Krasniqi was the acting President of Kosovo, following the resignation of Behgjet Pacolli. He did not effectively assume office until April 2, 2011; a ceremony is yet to take place on Monday, April 4. 
On April 7 Atifete Jahjaga was elected as President of Kosovo thus ending Jakup Krasniqi's serving as the acting President of Kosovo.

In November 2020 he was arrested for charges of crimes against humanity and war crime filed before the Kosovo Specialist Chambers.

Personal life
Krasniqi is married to Sevdije (Shala) Krasniqi and has four children; three daughters and one son.

Books
 "Kthesa e Madhe – Ushtria Çlirimtare e Kosovës"; Publishing House "Buzuku", 304 p., Prishtina/Kosovo 2006. 
 “Kosova in a historical context” Publisher by “Europrinty” 128 p. Prishtina/Kosovo 2007. 
 "Kthesa e Madhe – Ushtria Çlirimtare e Kosovës"; Completed the second edition. Publishing House "Buzuku", 320 p., Prishtina/Kosovo 2007. 
 "Një luftë ndryshe për Kosovën"; Publishing House "Buzuku", 224 faqe, Prishtina/Kosovo 2007; 
 "Kosova në kontekst historik"; Completed the second edition. Publishing House "Buzuku", 208 p., Prishtina/Kosovo 2010; 
 "Pavarësia si kompromis"; Publishing House "Buzuku", 208 p., Prishtina/Kosovo 2010; 
 "Lëvizja për Republikën e Kosovës 1981-1991 sipas shtypit shqiptar"; Publishing House "Buzuku", 320 p., Prishtina/Kosovo 2011; 
 "Pranvera e lirisë '81"; Publishing House "Buzuku", 192 p., Prishtina/Kosovo 2011; 
 "Flijimi për lirinë"; Publishing House "Buzuku", 192 p., Prishtina/Kosovo 2011; 
 "Guxo ta duash lirinë"; Publishing House "Buzuku", 192 p., Prishtina/Kosovo 2011; 
 "Pavarësi dhe personalitete (Në 100-vjetorin e Pavarësisë së Shqipërisë)"; Publishing House "Buzuku", 400 p., Prishtina/Kosovo 2012; 
 "Një histori e kontestuar (Kritikë librit të Oliver Jens Schmitt: “Kosova - histori e shkurtër e një treve qendrore ballkanike”)"; Publishing House "Buzuku", 224 p., Prishtina/Kosovo 2013; 
 "Zhurmuesit e demokracisë"; Publishing House "Buzuku", 192 p., Prishtina/Kosovo 2016; 
 "Reflektime demokratike"; Publishing House "Buzuku", 408 p., Prishtina/Kosovo 2017; 
 "Arti i bisedimeve"; Publishing House "Buzuku", 216 p., Prishtina/Kosovo 2018;

Notes

References

External links
 Jakup Krasniqi at the Assembly of Kosovo

|-

|-

1951 births
Living people
Kosovan Muslims
Kosovo Albanians
Albanian nationalists in Kosovo
Democratic Party of Kosovo politicians
Chairmen of the Assembly of the Republic of Kosovo
Kosovo Liberation Army soldiers
People from Drenas
Presidents of Kosovo
People indicted by the Kosovo Specialist Chambers